Erich Hubel is an Australian Paralympic athlete and wheelchair basketballer. At the 1980 Arnhem Paralympics, he won a silver medal in the Men's 800 m 5 event and two bronze medals in the Men's 1500 m 5 and Men's 100 m 5 events. He was also part of the Australia men's national wheelchair basketball team at the 1980 Arnhem, 1984 New York/Stoke Mandeville, and 1988 Seoul Paralympics.

References

Paralympic athletes of Australia
Paralympic wheelchair basketball players of Australia
Athletes (track and field) at the 1980 Summer Paralympics
Wheelchair basketball players at the 1980 Summer Paralympics
Wheelchair basketball players at the 1984 Summer Paralympics
Wheelchair basketball players at the 1988 Summer Paralympics
Medalists at the 1980 Summer Paralympics
Paralympic silver medalists for Australia
Paralympic bronze medalists for Australia
Living people
Year of birth missing (living people)
Paralympic medalists in athletics (track and field)
Australian male wheelchair racers